Greatest Hits is a compilation album by American rock band Lynyrd Skynyrd, released in 2008 in Europe only.

Track listing 

"Sweet Home Alabama" (Ed King, Gary Rossington, Ronnie Van Zant) – 4:45
"Free Bird" (Allen Collins, Van Zant) – 9:08
"Saturday Night Special" (King, Van Zant) – 5:08
"Gimme Three Steps" (Collins, Van Zant) – 4:26
"Double Trouble" (Collins, Van Zant) – 2:48
"What's Your Name?" (Rossington, Van Zant) – 3:31
"Gimme Back My Bullets" (Rossington, Van Zant) – 3:28
"I Ain't the One" (Rossington, Van Zant) – 3:52
"Whiskey Rock-a-Roller" (King, Billy Powell, Van Zant) – 4:15
"Simple Man" (Rossington, Van Zant) – 5:54
"Down South Jukin'" (Rossington, Van Zant) – 2:12
"You Got That Right" (Steve Gaines, Van Zant) – 3:46
"On the Hunt" (Collins, Van Zant) – 5:25
"Workin' for MCA" (King, Van Zant) – 4:43
"Tuesday's Gone" (Collins, Van Zant) – 7:28
"Call Me the Breeze" (J.J. Cale) – 5:08

Tracks 1, 14, and 16 from Second Helping (1974)
Tracks 2, 4, 8, 10, and 15 from (Pronounced 'Lĕh-'nérd 'Skin-'nérd) (1973)
Tracks 3, 9, and 13 from Nuthin' Fancy (1975)
Tracks 5 and 7 from Gimme Back My Bullets (1976)
Tracks 6 and 12 from Street Survivors (1977)
Track 11 from Skynyrd's First and... Last (1978)

Charts

Certifications

References

2008 greatest hits albums
Albums produced by Tom Dowd
Lynyrd Skynyrd compilation albums
MCA Records compilation albums